The Advanced/36 was an IBM midrange computer based on an adapted IBM AS/400 hardware and System/36 software. It was marketed from October 1994 to 2000.

Overview
The Advanced/36 is physically smaller than other S/36 offerings due to the use of more advanced hardware.

By the year 2000, the A/36 was no longer being marketed. The Advanced/36 Machine support in OS/400 was removed in V4R5.

Configurations 
The maximum configuration of an Advanced/36 is 4.19 Gb of disk storage, 256 Mb of memory, one tape drive, and one single 8" (or 5.25") diskette drive along with a communication adapter for modems (like BSCA/SLDC) and the twinax. brick(s) and a card for installing 9-track tape drive (9438-12).

The A/36 was marketed in three packages: the Small package, the Growth package, and the Large package. Machines sold in 1994 contained a version of the System Support Program (SSP) operating system designated "7.1", this was the 9402-236. In 1995, an upgraded A/36 was offered with a version of SSP designated "7.5", these were the 9402-436 model. A 236 could be upgraded to a 436. The 436 model could also run OS/400.

There were three CPU options, differing by performance. The base was known as #2102, and the next level up was #2104, which was 1.3 times faster. The final option, #2106, was advertised as 2.4 times faster than the base model.

Software 

SSP for the Advanced/36 supported the same programming languages as the standard S/36 systems, namely RPG II, COBOL, FORTRAN, System/36 BASIC, and Assembler. The Advanced/36 also included the Programmer and Operator Productivity Aid utility as standard.

Backup and storage 
One difference between the A/36 and earlier S/36s is the 9402 Tape Drive. The 9402 uses Quarter-inch cartridges which can store up to 2.5 Gb of data. The 9402 is able to read the 60MB tapes from the older S/36 6157 tape drive, but cannot write to them.

The A/36 CD-ROM drive is provided for PTF installation only. PTF CDs can only be applied if the operator follows a bypass procedure to switch device codes with the tape unit. The CD unit becomes TC. The CD unit was only on the 436 model, not the 236.

The A/36 8" diskette drive is optional and was marketed for approximately US$1,000. A 5.25" diskette drive option was also available. These were intended to allow migration of data from older S/36 hardware.

References

External links 
 IBM Archives - AS/400 Advanced 36

Minicomputers
IBM minicomputers
Computer-related introductions in 1994
AS/400
Products and services discontinued in 2000